Iveta Malachovská (born 11 May 1965) is a Slovak television presenter and actress. She has presented television programmes on stations including Czechoslovak Television, Slovenská televízia (STV) and Markíza. Malachovská has hosted the Slovak versions of The Biggest Loser and Who Wants to Be a Millionaire?.

Career
Malachovská studied at the Film and TV School of the Academy of Performing Arts in Prague and later worked for Czechoslovak Television and Slovenská televízia. Her presenting debut came in 1989 with the programme . As an actress, she played a role in the 1990 film . She also had a minor role in the 1997 Martin Šulík film Orbis Pictus. She first presented Slovak Footballer of the Year in 1995, going on to present it a record eight times.

Malachovská joined private television network Markíza in 1996, staying until 2006. In 2006 she returned to Slovenská televízia, going on to host the reality show , the Slovak version of The Biggest Loser. She subsequently fronted the Slovak version of Who Wants to Be a Millionaire? between 2007 and its final episode on 29 March 2008.

Malachovská functioned as co-producer on the 2008 Václav Marhoul film Tobruk.

Personal life
Born in Bratislava as Iveta Pašková, she married opera singer Martin Malachovský in 1993. The couple has a daughter together called Kristína. Malachovská has a sister who is two years older.

References

External links

1965 births
Living people
Actors from Bratislava
Slovak film actresses
Slovak television presenters
Academy of Performing Arts in Prague alumni
Slovak women television presenters
Who Wants to Be a Millionaire?